The Canova Lions, located in front of the Corcoran Gallery of Art in Washington, D.C., are copies of a pair of lions sculpted by Antonio Canova in 1792 for the tomb of Pope Clement XIII in St Peter's in Rome. The originals were sculpted from marble; these were cast in bronze from molds of the originals. The pieces were installed in 1860.

See also

 1860 in art
 List of public art in Washington, D.C., Ward 2

References

External links
 

1860 establishments in Washington, D.C.
1860 sculptures
Animal sculptures in Washington, D.C.
Bronze sculptures in Washington, D.C.
Outdoor sculptures in Washington, D.C.
Statues in Washington, D.C.
Sculptures of lions
Foggy Bottom